Flint House may refer to:

 The Police Rehabilitation Centre, Flint House, in the United Kingdom
 Flint House (Massachusetts)
 Flint House, Buckinghamshire, 2015 house in England
 Flint House (University of Chicago)